Sam McPheeters (born 1969 Lorain, Ohio) is an American artist, journalist, novelist, and performer. Raised in Albany, New York, he became a published author at age 12, with Travelers' Tales, a collection of regional folklore. In 1985, McPheeters grew active with the hardcore punk scene, producing several fanzines and organizing local concerts. After moving to New York City in 1987, he co-founded Born Against in 1989 and the Vermiform Records label in 1990. In 1993, he co-founded the Virginia-based band Men's Recovery Project, and in 2003, he co-founded the Los Angeles-based band Wrangler Brutes.

Starting in 2005, McPheeters has written for a variety of national magazines, including the Chicago Reader, Huffington Post, the OC Weekly, Vice, and the Village Voice. In 2012, his first novel, The Loom Of Ruin, was published through Los Angeles-based Mugger Books and received positive reviews. He lives in Pomona, California.

In 2016, Talos Press release McPheeters' second novel, Exploded View.

In 2020 Sam's third book (an anti-memoir), "Mutations: The Many Strange Faces of Hardcore Punk", was published by Rare Bird Books. The book includes musings about Fort Thunder, Thrones (band), Muzak, and The Flying Lizards, with a foreword by Tobi Vail of Bikini Kill.

Bibliography 
 (1981) Travelers Tales
 (2012) The Loom Of Ruin
 (2016) Exploded View
 (2020) Mutations: The Many Strange Faces of Hardcore Punk

Discography 
 Fear of Smell (1993)
 Feer of Smell (1998)
 Sam McPheeters / The Catholic Church (1998)

with Born Against 
 Born Against (1990)
 Eulogy
 Nine Patriotic Hymns for Children
 Battle Hymns of the Race War (1993)
 Suckerpunch split
 Screeching Weasel split (1993)
 Universal Order of Armageddon split (1993)
 Man Is The Bastard split (1994)
Compilation appearances
 Murders Among Us (1990)
 Forever
 Bllleeeeaaauuurrrrgghhh!
 Our Voice, Pro Choice
 Give Me Back (1991)
 The Dignity of Human Being is Vulnerable
 God's Chosen People
 False Object Sensor

with Men's Recovery Project 
 Frank Talk About Humans (1994)
 Botanica Mysteria (1996)
 Grappling with the Homonids (1998)
 Golden Triumph of Naked Hostility (1998)
 Resist The New Way (1999)
 Boldies over Basra (2000)
 The Very Best of Men's Recovery Project (2005)

with Wrangler Brutes 
 Cassette
 Tour 7"
 Zulu (2004)

External links 
 sammcpheeters.com
 Sam McPheeters' articles at Vice

References
Notes

1969 births
Living people
American rock singers
American male journalists
21st-century American novelists
Men's Recovery Project members
Born Against members
21st-century American non-fiction writers
21st-century American male writers